Don Ralke  (July 13, 1920 – January 26, 2000)  was an American music arranger, composer, and record producer, working for four decades in the Hollywood studio system in films, television, and pop recordings.  He was born on July 13, 1920, in Battle Creek, Michigan.  Ralke died on January 26, 2000, in Santa Rosa, California.

Education
Ralke received his bachelor's and master's degrees in music from the University of Southern California, graduating with honors. He also studied with famed composer and Hollywood emigre, Arnold Schoenberg.

Career overview
On the bongos Ralke collaborated with versatile flute and reed instrumentalist, Buddy Collette on "Jazz Heat", "Bongo Beat".  Warner Bros. hired him for "Gershwin with Bongoes" and "The Savage and The Sensuous ", which is widely regarded as one of the best jungle exotica albums of that era.  He worked with Warren Barker on the music for 77 Sunset Strip and did the heavy musical lifting when Edd "Kookie" Byrnes, one of the show's stars, became a teen idol and recorded his one hit, "Kookie, Kookie (Lend Me Your Comb)".  Ralke performed similar duties for "Hawaiian Eye" star Connie Stevens when she recorded "Sixteen Reasons".  Other recordings include Jewel Akens' "The Birds and the Bees", and five other gold records. His orchestra backed Sam Cooke on several 1959-1960 songs. Ralke also recorded two hits by Ty Wagner: "I'm a No Count" as well as "Slander".  In the late 1960s he created his own record company. He collaborated with sound engineer Brad Miller on the hugely successful strings-with-environmental sounds creation, the Mystic Moods Orchestra.

Golden Throats
Working with "Golden Throats talent" became a specialty niche for Ralke.  Ralke is credited for convincing non-singers including William Shatner and Lorne Greene to play it safe and stick to narration over a musical background.  Ralke also produced Beach Boys dad Murry Wilson's The Many Moods of Murray Wilson which was not kindly lauded by critics but nonetheless has achieved a place as an important footnote in 1960s music.

Snoopy, Come Home
In 1972 Ralke produced and orchestrated Bob and Dick Sherman's Grammy nominated musical film Snoopy, Come Home.

Happy Days/Laverne and Shirley
In the 1970s, he returned to television, working for producer Garry Marshall on the series "Happy Days" and its spin-off, "Laverne and Shirley".

Description by colleagues
Ralke was once described by Stan Ross, co-founder of Gold Star recording studio, as "the most well-known unknown in the business."

Recordings
77 Sunset Strip / Sebastian - WB 5025 (single)
Zooba / Stardust - WB 5058
Very Truly Yours, Crown Records CLP 5018
Dance Caper in Hi-Fi, Warner Bros. Records WBS-1300
Bongo Madness, Crown Records CLP 5019
Bourbon Street Beat, Warner Bros. Records WBS-1321
But You've Never Heard Gershwin with Bongoes, Warner Bros. Records WBS-1360
The Savage and the Sensuous Bongoes, Warner Bros. Records WBS-1398
Jerry Howard Plays Crazy Guitar, Imperial Records LP-9106
(arranger/producer on) The Transformed Man, William Shatner Decca DLP-75043
(arranger/producer on) "Ringo", Lorne Greene
C'mon Let's Live a Little (soundtrack), Liberty LST-7430
(arranger/producer on) Snoopy Come Home Original Cast Soundtrack

Production and arrangement
Among the artists he either produced or arranged included Dick and Dee Dee.

The Cappetta Company
The Cappetta Company was a group that featured Suzie Cappetta. In the 1960s she wrote the song "Dave Hull, the Hullabalooer" which she and her grioup the Scuzzies recorded.<ref>KRLA Beat February 22, 1965 Dueling deejays</ref> Ralke did the arrangements on the Cappetta Company's single "Me And Bobby McGee" / "Gimme' That", which was produced by Ken Jenkins and engineered by Stan Ross.

Vic Malo
Hawaiian based Tongan singer/actor Vic Malo worked with Ralke. Malo in the late 1970s appeared as Billy Swan in Hawaii Five-O''. Also known as Vic Mataele, he was a fencing instructor, and related to the King of Tonga, Tāufaʻāhau Tupou IV. Ralke produced his self titled album. Malo's single "I Play Guitar And Sing A Song" / "Still No Emotion Shows", was also produced by Ralke.

References

External links
 Don Ralke

1920 births
2000 deaths
Record producers from Michigan
American entertainment industry businesspeople
Musicians from Michigan
20th-century American musicians
20th-century American businesspeople
Crown Records artists
University of Southern California alumni
People from Battle Creek, Michigan